Christophe Bouchut (born 24 September 1966 in Voiron, Isère) is a French professional racing driver. He currently competes in the NASCAR Whelen Euro Series, driving for Dexwet-df1 Racing and Alex Caffi Motorsport in a part-time effort. He won the 24 Hours of Le Mans in 1993. He was named as the first driver for the F1 Larrousse team for the 1995 season, but the team withdrew before the first race.

In his 30 years of racing, Bouchut has earned 105 victories, 85 pole positions, four overall wins in 24-hour races (1993 Le Mans, 1995 Daytona, 2001 and 2002 Spa), three FIA GT titles (2000–2002) and the 2011 American Le Mans Series LMP2 championship.

Racing record

24 Hours of Le Mans results

Complete International Formula 3000 results
(key) (Races in bold indicate pole position; races in italics indicate fastest lap.)

Complete FIA GT Championship results
(key) (Races in bold indicate pole position) (Races in italics indicate fastest lap)

Complete Porsche Supercup results
(key) (Races in bold indicate pole position) (Races in italics indicate fastest lap)

Complete GT1 World Championship results
(key) (Races in bold indicate pole position) (Races in italics indicate fastest lap)

Complete FIA World Endurance Championship results

Complete Blancpain Sprint Series results

NASCAR
(key) (Bold – Pole position awarded by qualifying time. Italics – Pole position earned by points standings or practice time. * – Most laps led.)

Whelen Euro Series - Elite 1

* Season still in progress.

References

External links
Official homepage

Career summary on Driver Database

1966 births
Living people
People from Voiron
French racing drivers
French Formula Three Championship drivers
FIA GT Championship drivers
24 Hours of Le Mans drivers
24 Hours of Le Mans winning drivers
International Formula 3000 drivers
24 Hours of Daytona drivers
American Le Mans Series drivers
European Le Mans Series drivers
FIA GT1 World Championship drivers
Porsche Supercup drivers
World Sportscar Championship drivers
FIA World Endurance Championship drivers
ADAC GT Masters drivers
24 Hours of Spa drivers
Blancpain Endurance Series drivers
Sportspeople from Isère
NASCAR drivers
24H Series drivers
Mercedes-AMG Motorsport drivers
Level 5 Motorsports drivers
Kolles Racing drivers
KTR drivers
Larbre Compétition drivers
Peugeot Sport drivers
Aston Martin Racing drivers
Porsche Motorsports drivers
Alan Docking Racing drivers
Graff Racing drivers
Nürburgring 24 Hours drivers